Atanas Karachorov (Bulgarian: Атанас Карачоров; born 18 June 1998) is a Bulgarian footballer who plays as a defender for Belasitsa Petrich.

Career

Ludogorets Razgrad
On 28 May 2017 he completed his debut for the team in the First League for the 3:1 win over Cherno More.

Montana
In June 2021 Karachorov joined Montana.

Career statistics

Club

References

External links
 

1998 births
Living people
Bulgarian footballers
PFC Ludogorets Razgrad II players
PFC Ludogorets Razgrad players
PFC Spartak Varna players
PFC Belasitsa Petrich players
First Professional Football League (Bulgaria) players
Second Professional Football League (Bulgaria) players
Association football defenders
People from Petrich
Sportspeople from Blagoevgrad Province
21st-century Bulgarian people